The Dlinza Forest pinwheel (Trachycystis clifdeni) is a species of very small, air-breathing, land snail, a terrestrial pulmonate gastropod mollusk in the family Charopidae.

This species is endemic to South Africa.  Its natural habitat is subtropical or tropical dry forests. The common name is a reference to the Dlinza Forest Nature Reserve.

References

Endemic fauna of South Africa
Charopidae
Gastropods described in 1932
Taxonomy articles created by Polbot